Jan Świątkowski (31 December 1920 – 2007) was a Polish rower. He competed in the men's coxless pair event at the 1952 Summer Olympics.

References

1920 births
2007 deaths
Polish male rowers
Olympic rowers of Poland
Rowers at the 1952 Summer Olympics
Sportspeople from Bydgoszcz